Leonel de Jesús Álvarez Zuleta (born 29 July 1965) is a Colombian former professional footballer who played as a defensive midfielder. He played 101 times for the Colombia national team between 1985 and 1997, making him the third most capped player in Colombian international football. He also served as head coach of the Colombia national team in 2011. Álvarez is the only coach to have been champion twice with Independiente Medellín.

He is the current manager of Peruvian club Cienciano.

Club career
Álvarez was born in Remedios, Colombia. He began his career with Independiente Medellín in 1983. In 1989, he was part of the Atlético Nacional team that won the Copa Libertadores in 1989. He won a Colombian league title with América de Cali in 1990 and another in 1995.

He has also played for Veracruz of Mexico and Real Valladolid of Spain.

Álvarez signed with Major League Soccer before the league's inaugural 1996 season, and was allocated to the Dallas Burn. In his year with the team, Álvarez he scored three goals and five assists for the team from a defensive midfield position, and was named as part of the MLS Best XI. Álvarez moved to Mexico for the 1997 season, where he played for Veracruz. He returned to Dallas Burn in 1998, where he recovered his starting position; Álvarez would be an extremely important player in the Burn's central midfield for the next two years, but near the end of 1999, he was traded to the New England Revolution for Ariel Graziani. Álvarez played for the Revolution throughout 2001 before the team decided not to renew his contract for the 2002 season.

Late in his career, he returned to Colombian football, where he played for Deportes Quindío and for Deportivo Pereira.

International career
Álvarez appeared in a total of 101 games for the Colombia, making his debut on 14 February 1985 against Poland. He appeared for Colombia in the 1990 and 1994 World Cups, playing in a total of seven games. Additionally, he played in the Copa América for his native country in 1987, 1989, 1991, 1993, and 1995.

Coaching career
Álvarez began his coaching career as technical assistant at Deportivo Pereira, one of his former clubs. In 2008, he worked as the assistant coach at Independiente Medellín, the team he began his career with, working as Santiago Escobar's understudy. After Escobar was fired Álvarez was promoted and given his first head coach opportunity. In his debut season as a coach, he helped make Medellín champions. In May 2010 he was named the assistant coach of the Colombia national team. In September 2011, he was appointed head coach of the team, following the resignation of Hernán Bolillo Gómez. He got off to a good start by beating Bolivia, but was sacked on 14 December that year after the Colombian squad recorded a 1–1 draw with Venezuela and a 2–1 loss with Argentina in the World Cup qualifying campaign. In July 2012, he was appointed as Itagüí's new coach.

Career statistics
Score and result list Colombia's goal tally first, score column indicates score after Álvarez goal.

See also
 List of men's footballers with 100 or more international caps

References

External links

International statistics at rsssf
Leonel Álvarez at Footballdatabase

1965 births
Living people
Sportspeople from Antioquia Department
Colombian footballers
Independiente Medellín footballers
América de Cali footballers
Atlético Nacional footballers
Deportes Quindío footballers
Deportivo Pereira footballers
Real Valladolid players
C.D. Veracruz footballers
FC Dallas players
New England Revolution players
Categoría Primera A players
La Liga players
Liga MX players
Major League Soccer players
Major League Soccer All-Stars
Colombian expatriate footballers
Colombian expatriate sportspeople in Spain
Expatriate footballers in Spain
Expatriate soccer players in the United States
Expatriate footballers in Mexico
Colombia international footballers
1990 FIFA World Cup players
1994 FIFA World Cup players
Association football midfielders
FIFA Century Club
1987 Copa América players
1989 Copa América players
1991 Copa América players
1993 Copa América players
1995 Copa América players
Deportivo Cali managers
Cerro Porteño managers
Colombian football managers
Independiente Medellín managers
Águilas Doradas Rionegro managers
Cienciano managers